Takudzwa Victoria Rosa "Tkay" Maidza (born 17 December 1995) is a Zimbabwean-born Australian singer-songwriter and rapper.

Biography 
Maidza was born in Harare, Zimbabwe. Her parents are metallurgists. In 2001, her family moved to Australia when she was five years old. They lived in Perth and Kalgoorlie in Western Australia and in Whyalla in South Australia before relocating to Adelaide in 2010. She graduated from St Michael's College at age 16 and studied architecture at the University of South Australia before becoming a full-time musician.

Maidza took part in Adelaide's Northern Sound System artist development program and released her debut single, "Brontosaurus", at age 17 with producer BadCop. She has since released an EP, Switch Tape, featuring collaborations with Night Slugs' Bok Bok and producer SBTRKT.  In January 2016, Maidza reached #66 in the Triple J Hottest 100 with her 2015 single "MOB". MOB was Maidza's first song to be played on Australian commercial radio.

Maidza has played Splendour in the Grass and the CMJ Music Marathon in 2014 and replaced Lykke Li at the 2015 St Jerome's Laneway Festival. She performed at the Triple J "Beat the Drum" concert in 2015 to celebrate the 40th anniversary of the radio station, both as a solo artist and with many other Australian guest rappers on an extended version of Hilltop Hoods' "Cosby Sweater". Maidza played most of the Australian major festivals in 2015 including Groovin the Moo, Falls Festival, Meredith Festival and a cameo at Stereosonic with WhatSoNot.

Maidza was featured in the Australian Vogue magazine in July 2015 and the French magazine Konbini. After featuring on Troye Sivan's debut album Blue Neighbourhood, Maidza supported Sivan in London, Paris and Berlin as well as a guest appearance in Los Angeles. Earlier, Maidza had supported Charli XCX on her Australian tour, as well as British band Years & Years in the UK.

In November 2015 Maidza featured in an episode of Le Petit Journal in her debut French TV appearance. A scheduled appearance at the French festival La Maroquinerie in November 2015 was cancelled. She later appeared on American radio as part of the second episode of Skrillex's OWSLA Radio on 13 February 2016.

On 30 August, Maidza premiered her single "Carry On", featuring guest vocals from US rapper Killer Mike. The track is the first single from her debut album, simply titled Tkay, which was released on 28 October 2016.

In May 2020, Maidza announced she had signed with acclaimed British independent label 4AD and released her new single 'Shook' with praise from NME and Rolling Stone.

In February 2021, Maidza released her new track "Kim", six months on from the release of her Last Year Was Weird, Vol.2 EP working with US artist Yung Baby Tate. 

Alongside the track’s release, Maidza also shared a new Adrian Yu-directed music video, which sees her embodying the imagery of three iconic Kims: Kim Possible, Lil' Kim, and Kim Kardashian.

In May 2021, Maidza announced that the third mixtape in her Last Year Was Weird series would be released on July 9 that year.

On 19 November 2021, Maidza released "Real Nice (H.C.T.F.)" with Young Franco featuring Nerve, which served as the theme song for the A-League, the Australian and New Zealand professional soccer league.

Artistry 
Maidza has said she admires the work of Nicki Minaj, Santigold, Major Lazer and Lorde.

Discography

Studio albums

Extended plays

Singles

As lead artist

As featured artist

Other appearances

Music videos

Awards and nominations

ARIA Music Awards
The ARIA Music Awards is an annual awards ceremony that recognises excellence, innovation, and achievement across all genres of Australian music. 

{| class="wikitable" style="width:85%;"
|-
! width=5%|Year
! style="width:40%;"| Nominated work
! style="width:40%;"| Category
! style="width:10%;"| Result
!width=5%|
|-
| rowspan="2" | 2017
| rowspan="2" | TKAY
| Breakthrough Artist
| 
| rowspan="2" align="center"|
|-
| Best Urban Album
| 
|-
| 2019
| "Awake"
| Best Hip Hop Release
| 
| align="center"| 
|-
| 2020
| Last Year Was Weird, Vol.2
| rowspan="2"|Best Soul/R&B Release
| 
| align="center"|
|-
| rowspan="2" | 2021
| Last Year Was Weird, Vol.3
| 
| rowspan="2" align="center"|
|-
| Nicholas Muecke for Tkay Maidza's "24k"
| Best Video
| 
|-

J Awards
The J Awards are an annual series of Australian music awards that were established by the Australian Broadcasting Corporation's youth-focused radio station Triple J. They commenced in 2005.
{| class="wikitable" style="width:85%;"
|-
! width=5%|Year
! style="width:40%;"| Nominated work
! style="width:40%;"| Category
! style="width:10%;"| Result
!width=5%|
|-
| 2020
| "Don't Call Again" 
| Australian Video of the Year
| 
| align="center"| 
|-

MTV Europe Music Awards
The MTV Europe Music Awards is an award presented by Viacom International Media Networks to honour artists and music in pop culture.
{| class="wikitable" style="width:85%;"
|-
! width=5%|Year
! style="width:40%;"| Nominated work
! style="width:40%;"| Category
! style="width:10%;"| Result
!width=5%|
|-
| 2016
| rowspan="2"|Herself 
| rowspan="2"|Best Australian Act
| 
| align="center"| 
|-
| 2018
| 
| align="center"| 
|-

National Live Music Awards
The National Live Music Awards are a broad recognition of Australia's diverse live industry, celebrating the success of the Australian live scene.
{| class="wikitable" style="width:85%;"
|-
! width=5%|Year
! style="width:40%;"| Nominated work
! style="width:40%;"| Category
! style="width:10%;"| Result
!width=5%|
|-
| rowspan="2" | 2016
| rowspan="4" | Herself
| Live Hip Hop Act of the Year
| 
| rowspan="2" align="center"| 
|-
| International Live Achievement (Solo)
| 
|-
| rowspan="2" | 2018
| Live Hip Hop Act of the Year
| 
| rowspan="2" align="center"| 
|-
| South Australian Live Voice of the Year
|

Rolling Stone Australia Awards 
The Rolling Stone Australia Awards are awarded annually in January or February by the Australian edition of Rolling Stone magazine for outstanding contributions to popular culture in the previous year.

{| class="wikitable" style="width:85%;"
|-
! width=5%|Year
! style="width:40%;"| Nominated work
! style="width:40%;"| Category
! style="width:10%;"| Result
!width=5%|
|-
| 2015
| Tkay Maidza
| Best New Artist
| 
| 
|-
| rowspan="2" | 2021
| Last Year Was Weird, Vol. 2
| Best Record
| 
| rowspan="2" | 
|-
| "Shook"
| Best Single
|

South Australian Music Awards
The South Australian Music Awards (previously known as the Fowler's Live Music Awards) are annual awards that exist to recognise, promote and celebrate excellence in the South Australian contemporary music industry. They commenced in 2012.
{| class="wikitable" style="width:85%;"
|-
! width=5%|Year
! style="width:40%;"| Nominated work
! style="width:40%;"| Category
! style="width:10%;"| Result
!width=5%|
|-
| 2014
| Tkay Maidza
| Best Electronica Artist
| 
| rowspan="9" align="center"|
|- 
| rowspan="4" | 2015
| rowspan="3" | Tkay Maidza
| Best Release 
| 
|-
| Best Female 
| 
|-
| Best Song 
| 
|-
| "Switch Lanes" (directed by Sachio Cook)
| Best Video
| 
|- 
| rowspan="2" | 2016
| Tkay Maidza
| Best Song 
| 
|-
| "Do It Right" (with Martin Solveig)
| Best International Collaboration
| 
|-
| 2017
| Tkay Maidza
| Best Female Artist 
| 
|- 
| 2018
| Tkay Maidza
| Most Popular Hip Hop Award
| 
|-

Other awards

References

External links 

Profile on Triple J Unearthed

Living people
ARIA Award winners
Australian women rappers
Australian hip hop musicians
Australian hip hop singers
Musicians from Adelaide
Zimbabwean emigrants to Australia
Australian people of Zimbabwean descent
Australian songwriters
Zimbabwean musicians
1995 births
Australian women pop singers
Dew Process artists
Downtown Records artists